Watership Down is a 1978 British animated adventure-drama film, written, produced and directed by Martin Rosen and based on the 1972 novel by Richard Adams. It was financed by a consortium of British financial institutions and was distributed by Cinema International Corporation in the United Kingdom. Released on 19 October 1978, the film was an immediate success and it became the sixth-most popular film of 1979 at the UK box office.

It features the voices of John Hurt, Richard Briers, Harry Andrews, Simon Cadell, Nigel Hawthorne and Roy Kinnear, among others, and was the last film work of Zero Mostel, as the voice of Kehaar the gull. The musical score was by Angela Morley and Malcolm Williamson. Art Garfunkel's hit song "Bright Eyes" was written by songwriter Mike Batt. It has garnered a cult following.

Plot
In Lapine language mythology, the world was created by the god Frith. All animals were grass eaters, living harmoniously. The rabbits multiplied, and their appetite led to a food shortage. Frith ordered the rabbit prince, El-Ahrairah, to control his people, but was scoffed at. In retaliation, Frith gave special gifts to every animal, making some into predators to hunt the rabbits. Satisfied that El-Ahrairah had learned his lesson, Frith gave rabbits the gifts of speed and cunning.

In the present, in a warren near Sandleford, a rabbit seer named Fiver has an apocalyptic vision and takes his older brother Hazel to beg the chief for evacuation. The chief dismisses them, and orders Captain Holly, the head of the warren's Owsla police force, to stop those trying to leave. Fiver and Hazel along with other rabbits named Bigwig, Blackberry, Pipkin, Dandelion, Silver, and Violet manage to escape, passing a sign (meaningless to them) confirming that a residential development is coming.

They journey through the woods, avoiding several dangerous situations; until Violet – the group's only doe – is killed by a hawk. The others eventually meet a rabbit named Cowslip, who invites them to his warren, where a farmer leaves Cowslip's group ample vegetables. They are grateful, but Fiver leaves when he senses something unsettling in the atmosphere. Bigwig follows, berating Fiver for causing tension when a snare catches Bigwig. Bigwig's friends manage to free him, and Fiver learns that the farmer is protecting and feeding Cowslip's warren so that he can snare rabbits for his own meals. The group returns to its journey.

The rabbits discover Nuthanger Farm, which contains a hutch of domesticated does. Before they can free the females, the farm cat and dog chase them away. Later, they are found by Captain Holly, who recounts the destruction of Sandleford by humans as well as vicious rabbits called the "Efrafans". Fiver finally finds the hill he envisioned, Watership Down, where the group settles in with Hazel as their new chief.

They soon befriend an injured black-headed seagull named Kehaar, who flies out in search of does. That night, the rabbits return to Nuthanger Farm to free the does, but an attempt to free them fails which ends with Hazel getting shot. Fiver follows a vision of the mythical Black Rabbit to his injured brother. Kehaar returns and, while pecking out buckshot from Hazel's leg with his beak, reports of the many does at the large Efrafa warren. Captain Holly describes it as a dangerous totalitarian state, but Hazel feels they must go there. Bigwig infiltrates the warren and is made an Owsla officer by their cruel chief, General Woundwort. Bigwig recruits several potential escapees to his cause, including Blackavar and Hyzenthlay. With Kehaar's help, the escapees find a boat to float down the river. That night, Kehaar leaves for his homeland with the gratitude of the warren.

Efrafan trackers eventually find Watership Down. Woundwort rejects Hazel's offer of peace and demands that all deserters must be turned over or Watership Down will be wiped out. While the Watership rabbits barricade their warren, Fiver slips into a trance, in which he envisions a dog running loose in the woods. His mumblings inspire Hazel to try and release the farm dog and lead it to the Efrafans. When they arrive at the farm, Hazel unties the dog and releases it while Blackberry, Dandelion and Hyzenthlay use themselves as bait to make the animal follow them. Meanwhile, when the Efrafans break through the warren's defences, Woundwort goes in alone; Blackavar attacks him but is easily killed. Bigwig ambushes Woundwort and they fight to a standstill. When the dog arrives and starts attacking the Efrafans, Woundwort abandons Bigwig and fearlessly attacks the dog. However, no trace of Woundwort is ever found, which leaves his fate a mystery.

Several years later, an elderly Hazel is visited by a strange ghostly rabbit, who invites him to join his own Owsla, assuring him of Watership Down's perpetual safety. Reassured, Hazel accepts and dies peacefully. His spirit follows the visitor through the woodland and trees towards the Sun, which metamorphoses into Frith, and the afterlife, as Frith's parting advice to El-Ahrairah is heard once more.

Cast

John Hurt as Hazel
Richard Briers as Fiver
Michael Graham Cox as Bigwig
John Bennett as Captain Holly
Ralph Richardson as the Chief Rabbit of Sandleford
Simon Cadell as Blackberry
Roy Kinnear as Pipkin
Terence Rigby as Silver
Mary Maddox as Clover
Richard O'Callaghan as Dandelion
Denholm Elliott as Cowslip
Zero Mostel as Kehaar
Harry Andrews as General Woundwort
Hannah Gordon as Hyzenthlay
Nigel Hawthorne as Campion
Lynn Farleigh as Tab the cat
Clifton Jones as Blackavar
Derek Griffiths as Vervain and Chervil
Michael Hordern as Frith
Joss Ackland as the Black Rabbit
Michelle Price as Lucy

Production
Film rights were purchased by producer Martin Rosen. He did this with the assistance of a merchant banker, Jake Eberts, who enjoyed the experience so much it launched Eberts's career in the film industry. The option for the film rights was £50,000.

Rosen estimated the budget at $2.4 million. Eberts raised $1 million from the Pearson company and clients of the merchant bank Lazard.

Production of the film began in 1975 by a new animation studio, formed in London by Rosen. It was originally going to be directed by John Hubley, who left after disagreements with the film's producer Martin Rosen. His work can still be found in the film, most notably in the "fable" scene. He was replaced by Rosen who thereby made his directorial debut.

The backgrounds and locations, especially Efrafa and the nearby railway, are based on the diagrams and maps in Richard Adams's original novel. Most of the locations in the movie either exist or were based on real spots in Hampshire and surrounding areas.

Music
The musical score was by Angela Morley and Malcolm Williamson, Morley replacing Williamson after the composer had fallen behind and only composed the prelude and main title theme in sketch form. A list of the musical cues for the film can be found on the composer's website, which also gives information about the different composers working on the project.

The soundtrack includes Art Garfunkel's British No. 1 hit, "Bright Eyes", which was written by the British singer and songwriter Mike Batt. He also wrote other songs for the film which were not used. The composer recorded three songs with vocals by Garfunkel, but only "Bright Eyes" made it to the film. The song "When You're Losing Your Way in the Rain" has a very similar feeling and arrangement, and was recorded by the former Zombies vocalist Colin Blunstone in 1979. Garfunkel's version was heard years later, on the Watership Down TV series soundtrack released in 2000. The song, like many others which appeared on the TV soundtrack, was never used in the show.

Release and reception

Watership Down was first released to the UK on 19 October 1978, and was later released in the United States on 1 November 1978, for the latter, the movie was distributed by AVCO Embassy Pictures.

Box office
The film was very successful at the box office. According to financier Jake Eberts, the investors who put up the $50,000 development finance "got their money back with interest, plus an additional $450,000, making a total of ten times their investment". Other investors in the film reportedly received a return of 5,000% on their investment.

Awards
The film was nominated for the Hugo Award for Best Dramatic Presentation in 1979.

Reception and legacy
Gene Siskel and Roger Ebert were divided on their opinions of Watership Down on their show Sneak Previews. Siskel thought that the film was too long, but that otherwise he found "most of it very effective" due to the film's success at situating the audience in the rabbits' point of view which put him "in touch with the delicate and brutal balance of nature". He also called the film "more mature than what we usually expect or get from an animated feature film". However, Ebert felt that the realism of the story, which he liked, did not match with the style of animation which he described as "soft-edged, cuddly and like a cartoon'.

Some critics commented on the film's success as an adaptation, such as The Observers Philip French, who wrote that "the novel's texture isn't there and the characters never take on strong pictorial identities". Later in the review he elaborated that the rabbit characters are "blandly drawn" and concluded that the film as a whole is "difficult to enthuse over". In The Times, David Robinson also criticised the film's translation to the screen as inaccessible for "People who come to the film without the assistance of the book", as they "may well have a little difficulty with the special lore and language of Richard Adams' rabbit civilisation" and with the fictional Lapine language spoken by the rabbits. Robinson nevertheless complimented the voice acting and the "fresh and pleasant" animation design. The Globe and Mails Jay Scott, on the other hand, described the animation backgrounds of the film as "second-rate shopping mall watercolor landscapes" but praised the film's allegorical aspects (drawing comparisons between the villain General Woundwort and Adolf Hitler), the realistic and compassionate approach to its rabbit characters, and the voice cast.

The Daily Mails Margaret Hinxman also praised the voice acting, the "delicious" music, and called the background landscapes "superb", but concluded that "Watership Down is by no stretch of the imagination a Disney-type animation feature film. Sadly, I have to say, if it had been I might have enjoyed it more." However, other critics drew favourable comparisons with Disney, notably Julian Fox in Films and Filming, who called Watership Down "far and away the most exciting and totally involving animated feature since Disney's peak years (ie that period which ended with Pinocchio, Dumbo and Bambi)." He praised in particular the aesthetics, sound design, and the film's way of humanising the rabbit characters without over-anthropomorphising them. The Guardians Derek Malcolm also complimented Kehaar the seagull's "most Disney-like" animation style even though he found the film as a whole to be "old-fashioned" and the song "Bright Eyes" to be "more than a trifle bland".

In a joint review of Watership Down and Ralph Bakshi's The Lord of the Rings, animation historian Michael Barrier described both films as "very stupid movies, of a special kind" and that "the films themselves show no sign that any intelligence was at work in making them" due to their "grim literalism" in adapting their source texts. He did describe Watership Down as the "least offensive" of the two but nevertheless characterised the animation style as "graceless" and expressed disappointment that the vision of the film's original director John Hubley was never fully realised. Newsweeks David Ansen also drew comparisons with The Lord of the Rings, but while he disliked Bakshi's film he was more effusive about Watership Down, which he said "has the relentless momentum of a good war movie" and "is swift of foot, graced with wit, and capable of touching the hearts of both children and adults".

In a review of the DVD edition, Film Freak Centrals Walter Chaw praised the film for offering an "unusually thoughtful" alternative to Disney animated films of the era: "Watership Down arose in that extended lull between Disney's heyday and its late-Eighties resurrection. ... Watership Down points to the dwindled potential for American animation to evolve into what anime has become: a mature medium for artistic expression of serious issues." Chaw commended the film's frankness, honesty, and themes of friendship and loyalty, concluding that, in spite of the film's violent elements, "the picture may be more appropriate for young children than a legion of condescendingly sugarcoated Disney fare."

Effects on children and BBFC classification
Watership Down has developed a reputation as a distressing children's text, with Ed Power of The Independent describing the film in a 40th anniversary retrospective as a "classic" but which "arguably traumatised an entire generation". In 2016, the British broadcaster Channel 5 faced criticism after broadcasting the film in a pre-watershed slot on Easter Sunday, which was seen to be in poor taste due to the film's representations of violence inflicted upon rabbits, and with many people on social media expressing concern about child viewers being distressed (though it is unclear whether any children were actually negatively affected). Despite the criticism, Channel 5 broadcast Watership Down on Easter Sunday again the following year.

Despite the film's reputation as traumatising, regulators and critics in 1978 expressed little concern about the film's potentially negative effects on children. When the film was first submitted to the British Board of Film Classification, the BBFC passed the film with a 'U' certificate (suitable for all ages), deciding that "Animation removes the realistic gory horror in the occasional scenes of violence and bloodshed, and we felt that, while the film may move children emotionally during the film's duration, it could not seriously trouble them once the spell of the story is broken, and that a 'U' certificate was therefore quite appropriate." This choice has been quite controversial though, and in 2012, the BBFC acknowledged that it had "received complaints about the suitability of Watership Down at 'U' almost every year since its classification". In 2022, the BBFC re-classified the film with a PG rating for "mild violence, threat, brief bloody images, language".

Like the BBFC, film critics in 1978 characterised Watership Down as suitable for children in spite of its potentially distressing aspects. The Spectators Ted Whitehead described it as "a straightforward children's adventure story". Scott in The Globe and Mail wrote that "Parents are more apt to feel squeamish about this than their children: there is nothing as devastating as the death of Bambi's mother. In Watership Down, some of the rabbits are unlucky and some live to old age. When they do die, the deaths are treated with sympathy but not morbidity. The message is that life is hard, and difficult, but that it's fun, and rewarding, too." Malcolm in The Guardian dismissed concerns about the film's suitability for children by stating that "It is not true, as had already been hinted at by some, that the film is too violent and disturbing for children. What, pray, about some of Grimms' fairy tales?" Fox in Films and Filming was one of the few critics to express caution by saying that, because of the "graphic horror", "one could scarcely recommend the film to the very young".

More recently, film critics and scholars have defended Watership Downs potential value for child audiences. Children's media scholar Catherine Lester argues that the violence is "never without a specific narrative or moral purpose" and that discussions of the film's effect upon children require "greater nuance" that acknowledges the complexity and variety of children as viewers and how they respond to films. Gerard Jones, in his essay on the film for the Criterion Collection, admits that the film "has troubled me ever since I first saw it" at the age of twenty-one, but that he believes it is an important film for viewers of all ages because it "asks us to spend time with those elements of existence that we will always find most troubling (and haunting and moving), and that we so rarely allow our children's culture or our own entertainment to dwell on." He cites as an example the non-violent death of Hazel from old age at the end of the film, which he calls "as joyous as it is poignant".

Media

Picture book
A picture book adaptation was also produced, titled The Watership Down Film Picture Book. Two editions of the book were published, one a hardcover, the other a reinforced cloth-bound edition. The contents include film stills linked with a combination of narration and extracts from the script, as well as a preface by Adams and a foreword by Rosen.

Home media releases
Watership Down was initially released on VHS in the UK by Thorn EMI Video, then later by Guild Home Video and later by PolyGram Video. It was given a DVD release in 2001 by Universal Pictures Home Entertainment and another in 2005 from Warner Home Video.

In the US, Watership Down was first released on CED in 1981 and was given a VHS release in 1983 by Warner Home Video. The film was re-released a number of times on VHS in the US by Warner Home Video, including through their Warner Bros. Classic Tales label, and was released on DVD in the US in 2002 and again in 2008. The 2002 DVD release was later duplicated for Warner Bros' 2005 DVD release in the UK, with the only difference being the film being converted to PAL format.

A UK Blu-ray for the film was planned to be released in 2010 but, due to a rights dispute between Euro-London Films, Universal Pictures, and Warner Bros., the release was cancelled. Warner eventually put out a BD release in Germany, where it held distribution rights. The UK Blu-ray was eventually released in 2013 by Universal using the same HD master as on Warner's 2008 DVD and 2011 German Blu-ray release. In 2014, Euro-London Films acquired the remaining US rights from Warner Bros. (who had held US distribution rights since the 1980s) and licensed the film to The Criterion Collection for release on DVD, Blu-ray and streaming in 2015 and Janus Films for theatrical repertory runs.

The British Film Institute planned to release the film as a 4K Ultra HD Blu-ray in the UK in February 2023, but cancelled the release due to external issues beyond their control.

References

Notes

External links

Watership Down: “Take Me with You, Stream, on Your Dark Journey” an essay by Gerard Jones at the Criterion Collection
Watership Down: Perspectives On and Beyond Animated Violence an open access book of academic essays about the film

Watership Down
1978 films
1978 animated films
1978 drama films
1970s fantasy adventure films
Animated drama films
Film controversies
British fantasy adventure films
British drama films
British animated fantasy films
1970s English-language films
British independent films
British epic films
Films about animal rights
Films about badgers
Rating controversies in film
Films based on fantasy novels
Films set in Berkshire
Films set on farms
Films set in Hampshire
Films directed by Martin Rosen
Films scored by Malcolm Williamson
Animated films about rabbits and hares
Animated films about birds
Animated films based on novels
Films based on British novels
1978 independent films
1978 directorial debut films
1970s British animated films
British adult animated films
1970s British films